Virtual advertising is the use of digital technology to insert virtual advertising content into a live or pre-recorded television show, often in sports events.
This technique is often used to allow broadcasters to overlay existing physical advertising panels (on the playfield) with virtual content on the screen when broadcasting the same event in multiple regions; a Spanish football game will be broadcast in Mexico with Mexican advertising images. Similarly, virtual content can be inserted onto empty space within the sports venue such as the field of play, where physical advertising cannot be placed due to regulatory or safety reasons. Virtual advertising content is intended to be photo-realistic, so that the viewer has the impression they are seeing the real in-stadium advertising.

History 
Throughout the 1980s and 2000s, advertisement on television and newspapers were a popular form of spreading information. Jeremiah Lynwood, a media and marketing expert, has had many years of experience on advertisement. His book on 'Digital Advertisement', describes his analysis towards the history and progression of advertisement within the US culture. Lynwood stated that "Thirty years ago, consumers viewed an average of 560 ads per day". This consisted mostly from newspapers, to television shows, to gasoline pumps, and so on. He also stated that, at the time, "American consumers may be exposed to 3,000 commercial messages every day". Within that time frame, the exposure of daily ads have supported many local and big businesses. Reaching the 2000s and 2010s, the increase of technological advances have created new opportunities for many businesses to grow. According to digital marketing experts, it is estimated that most Americans are exposed to nearly 4,000 to 10,000 ads each day. The use of cellular phones have created a new portal where broadcasters are able to push their ads on to the consumer, wherever and whenever they want.

Rights 

The advertising in the playfields is property of the club, except in some professional sports where the league or federation owns the advertising rights. However, the advertising rights broadcast on the screen are property of the broadcasters or the TV channel. This means that second right holders can benefit from selling this virtual advertising. The number of TV viewers is also higher than the people in the stadium, generating more visibility to the advertised marks and more income to the broadcasters.

Technology 

The technology used in virtual insertions often uses automated processes such as: automatic detection of playfield limits, automatic detection of cuts, recognition of playfield surface, recognition of existing logos for logo replacements, etc.

An operator is usually dedicated to the visual control of the effect but new systems allow to use the instant replay operator.

Applications

Live events 
Virtual advertisements can be effectively integrated into live television in real-time. For example, Fox Sports Net places a virtual advertisement on the glass behind the goaltender that can only be seen on television.

In Formula One, virtual ads are placed on the grass or as virtual billboards.

In baseball, Major League Baseball places virtual advertisements on a back-board behind the batter which can be targeted differently in local markets or countries. During the World Series, MLB international broadcasts of the World Series feature different advertisements on a per market basis, showing a different ad in the US, Canadian, Latin American and Japanese markets.

In tennis, e.g. during the 2019 ATP Finals in London's O2 Arena certain logos in the background were replaced for various country feeds.

In table tennis e.g. during the ITTF World Tour Australian Open 2019 virtual advertising overlays were used by uniqFEED AG in Switzerland.

Virtual product placement 
The technology that enabled video tracking for virtual advertising has been used for the past decade to create virtual product placements in television shows hours, days, or years after they have been produced. This presents several benefits including the possibility of preserving an advertisement-free master copy of the show in order to generate revenue as product placements are added in the future. Advertisements can be targeted to regional markets and updated over time to ensure maximum efficiency of advertising money. A good example of how virtual advertising is used in our everyday life is used in sports. Virtual advertising uses the latest technology to place an ad in position to the field of play, regardless of camera motion, and the players' movement over the logos. This does not interfere with the viewers experience and allows a gate for many brands to put their image shared with a large scale of people. Recently, the NHL have virtually inserted sponsors on the glass above the physical boards in NHL stadiums. Big brands will not spend their time or money on hitting a certain region when their main goal is to build global brand awareness. Digital signage opportunities allow these larger brands to purchase signage in a stadium during games that are instead nationally televised. This gets even more expansive thanks to social media outlets like Twitter, Facebook, and Amazon. On the other hand, local businesses sign when there are smaller games going on. The signage is much more affordable and still reaches a vast number of people. Virtual advertising may even make live attendance more attractive to sport fans because the technology allows the playing field and surrounding areas to be cleared of advertisements while television viewers at home are exposed to commercials. For the most part, virtual advertising makes a live attendance more attractive to sports fans, because instead of being at home watching commercials, live fans are able to be clear of advertisements and enjoy the game without pop-up ads.

References

Digital media
Advertising by medium
Television technology
Sports television technology